The 2016–17 Chicago Bulls season was the 51st season of the franchise in the National Basketball Association (NBA). Former 2011 MVP and 2009 Rookie of the Year Derrick Rose was traded from his hometown team to the New York Knicks. This was the first season without Rose since the 2012–13 season and 2006-07 without Joakim Noah, who left to sign with the Knicks. Dwyane Wade, who played for the Miami Heat from 2003 to 2016, decided to leave the Heat and sign with his hometown team, the Chicago Bulls. A Chicago native, Wade grew up as a fan of the Bulls, and Michael Jordan. The Bulls also traded Tony Snell to the Milwaukee Bucks for Michael Carter-Williams on October 17, 2016.

The Bulls finished the regular season with a 41–41 record, securing the 8th seed. In the playoffs, they faced off against the Boston Celtics in the First Round, where they lost in 6 games.

Following the season, Jimmy Butler was traded to the Minnesota Timberwolves, Rajon Rondo was released and signed with the New Orleans Pelicans, and Dwyane Wade signed with the Cleveland Cavaliers.

This season marked the last time the Bulls made the playoffs until their 2021-22 season.

Draft picks

Roster

Standings

Division

Conference

Game log

Preseason

|- style="background-color:#fcc;"
| 1
| October 3
| Milwaukee
| 
| Butler, McDermott (13)
| Taj Gibson (12)
| Rajon Rondo (7)
| United Center20,104
| 0–1
|- style="background-color:#fcc;"
| 2
| October 6
| @ Indiana
| 
| Spencer Dinwiddie (19)
| Spencer Dinwiddie (6)
| Rajon Rondo (5)
| Bankers Life Fieldhouse12,925
| 0–2
|- style="background-color:#cfc;"
| 3
| October 8
| Indiana
| 
| Dwyane Wade (22)
| Nikola Mirotic (9)
| Dwyane Wade (8)
| United Center20,096
| 1–2
|- style="background-color:#cfc;"
| 4
| October 14
| Cleveland
| 
| Rajon Rondo (30)
| Taj Gibson (11)
| Rajon Rondo (6)
| United Center21,766
| 2–2
|- style="background-color:#cfc;"
| 5
| October 15
| @ Milwaukee
| 
| Isaiah Canaan (25)
| Robin Lopez (11)
| Jerian Grant (7)
| BMO Harris Bradley Center10,794
| 3–2
|- style="background-color:#fcc;"
| 6
| October 17
| Charlotte
| 
| Jimmy Butler (15)
| Cristiano Felicio (12)
| Rajon Rondo (10)
| United Center20,025
| 3–3
|- style="background-color:#fcc;"
| 7
| October 20
| @ Atlanta
| 
| Jimmy Butler (18)
| Gibson, Rondo (9)
| Butler, Rondo, Wade (6)
| CenturyLink Center Omaha16,506
| 3–4

Regular season

|- style="background:#bfb"
| 1
| October 27
| Boston
| 
| Jimmy Butler (24)
| Taj Gibson (10)
| Rajon Rondo (9)
| United Center21,501
| 1–0
|- style="background:#bfb"
| 2
| October 29
| Indiana
| 
| Doug McDermott (23)
| Gibson, Felicio (8)
| Rajon Rondo (13)
| United Center21,373
| 2–0
|- style="background:#bfb"
| 3
| October 31
| @ Brooklyn
| 
| Jimmy Butler (23)
| Taj Gibson (11)
| Isaiah Canaan (6)
| Barclays Center15,842
| 3–0

|- style="background:#fbb"
| 4
| November 2
| @ Boston
| 
| Jimmy Butler (23)
| Rajon Rondo (10)
| Rajon Rondo (5)
| TD Garden18,624
| 3–1
|- style="background:#fbb"
| 5
| November 4
| New York
| 
| Dwyane Wade (35)
| Dwyane Wade (10)
| Rajon Rondo (5)
| United Center22,376
| 3–2
|- style="background:#fbb"
| 6
| November 5
| @ Indiana
| 
| Butler, Portis (16)
| Taj Gibson (12)
| Rajon Rondo (5)
| Bankers Life Fieldhouse17,020
| 3–3
|- style="background:#bfb"
| 7
| November 7
| Orlando
| 
| Jimmy Butler (20)
| Taj Gibson (11)
| Jimmy Butler (7)
| United Center21,320
| 4–3
|- style="background:#fbb"
| 8
| November 9
| @ Atlanta
| 
| Jimmy Butler (39)
| Taj Gibson (6)
| Rondo, Butler (7)
| Philips Arena16,354
| 4–4
|- style="background:#bfb"
| 9
| November 10
| @ Miami
| 
| Jimmy Butler (20)
| Rajon Rondo (12)
| Rajon Rondo (6)
| American Airlines Arena19,600
| 5–4
|- style="background:#bfb"
| 10
| November 12
| Washington
| 
| Jimmy Butler (37)
| Robin Lopez (13)
| Jimmy Butler (9)
| United Center21,962
| 6–4
|- style="background:#bfb"
| 11
| November 15
| @ Portland
| 
| Jimmy Butler (27)
| Jimmy Butler (12)
| Butler, Wade (5)
| Moda Center13,393
| 7–4
|- style="background:#bfb"
| 12
| November 17
| @ Utah
| 
| Jimmy Butler (20)
| Butler, Lopez (12)
| Jimmy Butler (3)
| Vivint Smart Home Arena19,911
| 8–4
|- style="background:#fbb"
| 13
| November 19
| @ L.A. Clippers
| 
| Dwyane Wade (28)
| Rajon Rondo (10)
| Rajon Rondo (8)
| Staples Center19,060
| 8–5
|- style="background:#bfb"
| 14
| November 20
| @ L.A. Lakers
| 
| Jimmy Butler (40)
| Nikola Mirotic (15)
| Rajon Rondo (12)
| Staples Center18,997
| 9–5
|- style="background:#fbb"
| 15
| November 22
| @ Denver
| 
| Jimmy Butler (35)
| Rajon Rondo (11)
| Rajon Rondo (8)
| Pepsi Center14,328
| 9–6
|- style="background:#bfb"
| 16
| November 25
| @ Philadelphia
| 
| Jimmy Butler (26)
| Rajon Rondo (8)
| Rajon Rondo (10)
| Wells Fargo Center18,234
| 10–6
|- style="background:#fbb"
| 17
| November 30
| L.A. Lakers
| 
| Jimmy Butler (22)
| Taj Gibson (10)
| Rondo, Wade (6)
| United Center21,773
| 10–7

|- style="background:#bfb"
| 18
| December 2
| Cleveland
|  
| Jimmy Butler (26)
| Rondo, Gibson (11)
| Rajon Rondo (12)
| United Center21,775
| 11–7
|- style="background:#fbb"
| 19
| December 3
| @ Dallas
| 
| Jimmy Butler (26)
| Jimmy Butler (9)
| Jimmy Butler (4)
| American Airlines Center19,857
| 11–8
|- style="background:#fbb"
| 20
| December 5
| Portland
| 
| Dwyane Wade (34)
| Robin Lopez (14)
| Jimmy Butler (5)
| United Center21,351
| 11–9
|- style="background:#fbb"
| 21
| December 6
| @ Detroit
| 
| Jimmy Butler (32)
| Taj Gibson (10)
| Dwyane Wade (7)
| The Palace of Auburn Hills14,305
| 11–10
|- style="background:#bfb"
| 22
| December 8
| San Antonio
| 
| Dwyane Wade (20)
| Rajon Rondo (10)
| Rajon Rondo (9)
| United Center21,489
| 12–10
|- style="background:#bfb"
| 23
| December 10
| Miami
| 
| Jimmy Butler (31)
| Robin Lopez (10)
| Rajon Rondo (6)
| United Center21,348
| 13–10
|- style="background:#fbb"
| 24
| December 13
| Minnesota
| 
| Jimmy Butler (27)
| Jimmy Butler (9)
| Jimmy Butler (6)
| United Center21,146
| 13–11
|- style="background:#fbb"
| 25
| December 15
| @ Milwaukee
| 
| Jimmy Butler (21)
| Robin Lopez (6)
| Rajon Rondo (8)
| Bradley Center16,704
| 13–12
|- style="background:#fbb"
| 26
| December 16
| Milwaukee
| 
| Dwyane Wade (12)
| Bobby Portis (8)
| Jimmy Butler (6)
| United Center21,324
| 13–13
|- style="background:#bfb"
| 27
| December 19
| Detroit
| 
| Jimmy Butler (19)
| Rajon Rondo (8)
| Rajon Rondo (14)
| United Center21,400
| 14–13
|- style="background:#fbb"
| 28
| December 21
| Washington
| 
| Jimmy Butler (20)
| Butler, Gibson (11)
| Rajon Rondo (10)
| United Center21,358
| 14–14
|- style="background:#fbb"
| 29
| December 23
| @ Charlotte
| 
| Jimmy Butler (26)
| Nikola Mirotic (10)
| Rajon Rondo (10)
| Spectrum Center19,249
| 14–15
|- style="background:#fbb"
| 30
| December 25
| @ San Antonio
| 
| Dwyane Wade (24)
| Taj Gibson (7)
| Dwyane Wade (6)
| AT&T Center18,428
| 14–16
|- style="background:#bfb"
| 31
| December 26
| Indiana
| 
| Dwyane Wade (21)
| Robin Lopez (12)
| Rondo, Butler, Wade (5)
| United Center21,922
| 15–16
|- style="background:#bfb"
| 32
| December 28
| Brooklyn
| 
| Jimmy Butler (40)
| Jimmy Butler (11)
| Rajon Rondo (12)
| United Center21,957
| 16–16
|- style="background:#fbb"
| 33
| December 30
| @ Indiana
| 
| Jimmy Butler (25)
| Cristiano Felicio (12)
| Dwyane Wade (5)
| Bankers Life Fieldhouse17,923
| 16–17
|- style="background:#fbb"
| 34
| December 31
| Milwaukee
| 
| Jimmy Butler (26)
| Robin Lopez (10)
| Jimmy Butler (8)
| United Center21,838
| 16–18

|- style="background:#bfb"
| 35
| January 2
| Charlotte
| 
| Jimmy Butler (52)
| Jimmy Butler (12)
| Jimmy Butler (6)
| United Center21,612
| 17–18
|- style="background:#bfb"
| 36
| January 4
| @ Cleveland
| 
| Jimmy Butler (20)
| Taj Gibson (7)
| Jimmy Butler (8)
| Quicken Loans Arena20,562
| 18–18
|- style="background:#bfb"
| 37
| January 7
| Toronto
| 
| Jimmy Butler (42)
| Butler, McDermott (10)
| Dwyane Wade (7)
| United Center21,195
| 19–18
|- style="background:#fbb"
| 38
| January 9
| Oklahoma City
| 
| Dwyane Wade (22)
| Cristiano Felicio (11)
| Jimmy Butler (7)
| United Center21,923
| 19–19
|- style="background:#fbb"
| 39
| January 10
| @ Washington
| 
| Denzel Valentine (19)
| Taj Gibson (12)
| Grant, Rondo (6)
| Verizon Center14,361
| 19–20
|- style="background:#fbb"
| 40
| January 12
| @ New York
| 
| Dwyane Wade (22)
| Taj Gibson (9)
| Rajon Rondo (8)
| Madison Square Garden19,812
| 19–21　
|- style="background:#bfb"
| 41
| January 14
| New Orleans
| 
| Jimmy Butler (28)
| Taj Gibson (16)
| Wade, Rondo (5)
| United Center21,916
| 20–21
|- style="background:#bfb"
| 42
| January 15
| @ Memphis
| 
| Doug McDermott (31)
| Butler, Gibson (8)
| Jimmy Butler (6)
| FedExForum18,119
| 21–21
|- style="background:#fbb"
| 43
| January 17
| Dallas
| 
| Jimmy Butler (24)
| Jimmy Butler (9)
| Jimmy Butler (12)
| United Center21,294
| 21–22
|- style="background:#fbb"
| 44
| January 20
| @ Atlanta
| 
| Jimmy Butler (19)
| Bobby Portis (7)
| Rondo, Wade, Butler (3)
| Philips Arena16,328
| 21–23
|- style="background:#bfb"
| 45
| January 21
| Sacramento
| 
| Dwyane Wade (30)
| Cristiano Felicio (10)
| Jimmy Butler (7)
| United Center21,606
| 22–23
|- style="background:#bfb"
| 46
| January 24
| @ Orlando
| 
| Dwyane Wade (21)
| Cristiano Felicio (10)
| Jimmy Butler (4)
| Amway Center18,846
| 23–23
|- style="background:#fbb"
| 47
| January 25
| Atlanta
| 
| Jimmy Butler (40)
| Taj Gibson (10)
| Rondo, Butler, Grant (4)
| United Center21,445
| 23–24
|- style="background:#fbb"
| 48
| January 27
| Miami
| 
| Dwyane Wade (15)
| Rajon Rondo (7)
| Rajon Rondo (7)
| United Center22,082
| 23–25
|- style="background:#bfb"
| 49
| January 29
| Philadelphia
| 
| Jimmy Butler (28)
| Robin Lopez (10)
| Rajon Rondo (10)
| United Center21,606
| 24–25

|- style="background:#bfb"
| 50
| February 1
| @ Oklahoma City
| 
| Jimmy Butler (28)
| Taj Gibson (8)
| Dwyane Wade (7)
| Chesapeake Energy Arena18,203
| 25–25
|- style="background:#fbb;"
| 51
| February 3
| @ Houston
| 
| Michael Carter-Williams (23)
| Robin Lopez (10)
| Carter-Williams, Wade (6)
| Toyota Center18,055
| 25–26
|- style="background:#bfb;"
| 52
| February 6
| @ Sacramento
| 
| Dwyane Wade (31)
| Lopez, Carter-Williams, Wade (6)
| Rajon Rondo (6)
| Golden 1 Center17,608
| 26–26
|- style="background:#fbb;"
| 53
| February 8
| @ Golden State
| 
| Robin Lopez (17)
| Robin Lopez (10)
| Rajon Rondo (8)
| Oracle Arena19,596
| 26–27
|- style="background:#fbb;"
| 54
| February 10
| @ Phoenix
| 
| Jimmy Butler (20)
| Robin Lopez (7)
| Jimmy Butler (6)
| Talking Stick Resort Arena18,055
| 26–28
|- style= "background:#fbb;"
| 55
| February 12
| @ Minnesota
| 
| McDermott, Portis (16)
| Michael Carter-Williams (7)
| Carter-Williams, Rondo (6)
| Target Center 19,356
| 26–29
|- style= "background:#bfb;"
| 56
| February 14
| Toronto
| 
| Doug McDermott (20)
| Jimmy Butler (12)
| Rajon Rondo (5)
| United Center 21,220
| 27–29
|- style= "background:#bfb;"
| 57
| February 16
| Boston
| 
| Jimmy Butler (29)
| Taj Gibson (9)
| Rajon Rondo (8)
| United Center 21,866
| 28–29
|- style= "background:#bfb;"
| 58
| February 24
| Phoenix
| 
| Dwyane Wade (23)
| Nikola Mirotic (8)
| Rondo, Butler (9)
| United Center 21,641
| 29–29
|- style= "background:#bfb;"
| 59
| February 25
| @ Cleveland
| 
| Dwyane Wade (20)
| Jimmy Butler (10)
| Butler, Wade (10)
| Quicken Loans Arena 20,562
| 30–29
|- style= "background:#fbb;"
| 60
| February 28
| Denver
| 
| Rondo, Wade (19)
| Denzel Valentine (7)
| Rajon Rondo (5)
| United Center 21,015
| 30–30

|- style="background:#bfb;"
| 61
| March 2
| Golden State
| 
| Jimmy Butler (22)
| Bobby Portis (13)
| Jimmy Butler (6)
| United Center22,253
| 31–30
|- style="background:#fbb;"
| 62
| March 4
| L.A. Clippers
| 
| Jimmy Butler (16)
| Portis, Mirotic (7)
| Rajon Rondo (9)
| United Center22,807
| 31–31
|- style="background:#fbb;"
| 63
| March 6
| @ Detroit
| 
| Jimmy Butler (27)
| Jimmy Butler (9)
| Jerian Grant (9)
| The Palace of Auburn Hills16,039
| 31–32
|- style="background:#fbb;"
| 64
| March 8
| @ Orlando
| 
| Jimmy Butler (21)
| Robin Lopez (9)
| Jimmy Butler (9)
| Amway Center16,063
| 31–33
|- style="background:#fbb;"
| 65
| March 10
| Houston
| 
| Dwyane Wade (21)
| Joffrey Lauvergne (9)
| Jerian Grant (5)
| United Center21,995
| 31–34
|- style="background:#fbb;"
| 66
| March 12
| @ Boston
| 
| Lopez, Valentine (13)
| Bobby Portis (8)
| Rajon Rondo (6)
| TD Garden18,624
| 31–35
|-style="background:#bfb;"
| 67
| March 13
| @ Charlotte
| 
| Nikola Mirotic (24)
| Nikola Mirotic (11)
| Jimmy Butler (11)
| Spectrum Center16,489
| 32–35
|-style="background:#fbb;"
| 68
| March 15
| Memphis
| 
| Rajon Rondo (17)
| Portis, Butler (7)
| Rajon Rondo (8)
| United Center21,583
| 32–36
|- style="background:#fbb;"
| 69
| March 17
| @ Washington
| 
| Jimmy Butler (28)
| Robin Lopez (12)
| Rajon Rondo (10)
| Verizon Center20,356
| 32–37
|-style="background:#bfb;"
| 70
| March 18
| Utah
| 
| Jimmy Butler (23)
| Denzel Valentine (12)
| Jimmy Butler (7)
| United Center21,953
| 33–37
|- style="background:#fbb;"
| 71
| March 21
| @ Toronto
| 
| Jimmy Butler (37)
| Jimmy Butler (10)
| Rajon Rondo (8)
| Air Canada Centre19,800
| 33–38
|- style="background:#bfb;"
| 72
| March 22
| Detroit
| 
| Nikola Mirotic (25)
| Joffrey Lauvergne (7)
| Jimmy Butler (12)
| United Center21,503
| 34–38
|- style="background:#fbb;"
| 73
| March 24
| Philadelphia
| 
| Jimmy Butler (36)
| Bobby Portis (11)
| Jimmy Butler (11)
| United Center21,558
| 34–39
|- style="background:#bfb;"
| 74
| March 26
| @ Milwaukee
| 
| Nikola Mirotic (28)
| Rajon Rondo (9)
| Jimmy Butler (14)
| Bradley Center17,669
| 35–39
|- style= "background:#bfb;"
| 75
| March 30
| Cleveland
| 
| Nikola Mirotic (28)
| Robin Lopez (11)
| Rajon Rondo (15)
| United Center22,282
| 36–39

|- style= "background:#bfb;"
| 76
| April 1
| Atlanta
| 
| Jimmy Butler (33)
| Rajon Rondo (11)
| Jimmy Butler (8)
| United Center22,019
| 37–39
|- style="background:#bfb;"
| 77
| April 2
| @ New Orleans
| 
| Jimmy Butler (39)
| Bobby Portis (11)
| Rajon Rondo (9)
| Smoothie King Center18,306
| 38–39
|-style="background:#fbb;"
| 78
| April 4
| @ New York
| 
| Jimmy Butler (26)
| Nikola Mirotic (10)
| Rajon Rondo (9)
| Madison Square Garden19,812
| 38–40
|- style="background:#bfb;"
| 79
| April 6
| @ Philadelphia
| 
| Nikola Mirotic (22)
| Bobby Portis (11)
| Jimmy Butler (10)
| Wells Fargo Center15,177
| 39–40
|- style="background:#fbb;"
| 80
| April 8
| @ Brooklyn
| 
| Jimmy Butler (33)
| Robin Lopez (8)
| Jerian Grant (5)
| Barclays Center17,732
| 39–41
|- style= "background:#bfb;"
| 81
| April 10
| Orlando
| 
| Robin Lopez (18)
| Lopez, Zipser (8)
| Jerian Grant (11)
| United Center21,545
| 40–41
|- style= "background:#bfb;"
| 82
| April 12
| Brooklyn
| | 
| Jimmy Butler (25)
| Bobby Portis (10)
| Rajon Rondo (5)
| United Center22,576
| 41–41

Playoffs

|- style="background:#bfb;"
| 1
| April 16
| @ Boston
| 
| Jimmy Butler (30)
| Robin Lopez (11)
| Rondo, Wade (6)
| TD Garden18,624
| 1–0
|- style="background:#bfb;"
| 2
| April 18
| @ Boston
| 
| Butler, Wade (22)
| Rajon Rondo (9)
| Rajon Rondo (14)
| TD Garden18,624
| 2–0
|- style="background:#fbb;"
| 3
| April 21
| Boston
| 
| Dwyane Wade (18)
| Cristiano Felício (11)
| Mirotic, Wade, Carter-Williams (3)
| United Center21,293
| 2–1
|- style="background:#fbb;"
| 4
| April 23
| Boston
| 
| Jimmy Butler (33)
| Bobby Portis (8)
| Jimmy Butler (9)
| United Center21,863
| 2–2
|- style="background:#fbb;"
| 5
| April 26
| @ Boston
| 
| Dwyane Wade (26)
| Dwyane Wade (11)
| Dwyane Wade (8)
| TD Garden18,624
| 2–3
|- style="background:#fbb;"
| 6
| April 28
| Boston
| 
| Jimmy Butler (23)
| Bobby Portis (11)
| Dwyane Wade (3)
| United Center21,682
| 2–4

Transactions

Trades

Free agency

Additions

Subtractions

References

Chicago Bulls seasons
Chicago Bulls
Chicago
Chicago